The 2001–02 Major Indoor Soccer League season was the first season for the second incarnation of the Major Indoor Soccer League following the dissolution of the National Professional Soccer League.  The regular season started on October 20, 2001, and ended on April 14, 2002.

League standings

Playoffs

Scoring leaders
GP = Games Played, G = Goals, A = Assists, Pts = Points

Source:

League awards
 Most Valuable Player: Dino Delevski, Kansas City
 Defender of the Year: Sean Bowers, Baltimore
 Rookie of the Year: Billy Nelson, Baltimore
 Goalkeeper of the Year: Victor Nogueira, Milwaukee
 Coach of the Year: Keith Tozer, Milwaukee
 Championship Series MVP: Chris Handsor, Philadelphia

Sources:

All-MISL Teams

First Team

Second Team

Source:

All-Rookie Team

Source:

References

External Links
Major Indoor Soccer League II (RSSSF)

Major Indoor Soccer League (2001–2008)
2001 in American soccer leagues
2002 in American soccer leagues
2001–02